Six Kingdoms may refer to:

In biology, a scheme of classifying organisms into six kingdoms:
Proposed by Carl Woese et al: Animalia, Plantae, Fungi, Protista, Archaea/Archaeabacteria, and Bacteria/Eubacteria
Proposed by Thomas Cavalier-Smith: Animalia, Plantae, Fungi, Chromista, Protozoa and Eukaryota
In Chinese history, six of the Seven Warring States that formed an alliance but were still conquered by Qin: Qi, Chu, Yan, Han, Zhao, and Wei

See also
 Six Dynasties